Hillmorton is a suburb of south-western Christchurch, New Zealand. The suburb is centred around the intersection of Lincoln Road and Hoon hay Road, two arterial routes which form part of State Highway 75 and feed into the Christchurch Southern Motorway which runs to the north of the suburb.

History
Hillmorton takes its name from Hill Morton Farm, the property of John Twigger, who settled in the area in 1863. Land from the subdivision of this farm was advertised for sale in a local newspaper in 1879 as being "part of Twigger's property known as Hillmorton". At the same time as Twigger settled the area, 1863 also saw the opening of the Sunnyside Hospital, Christchurch's first mental asylum. The buildings were constructed in a gothic style by architect John Campbell, and represented a shift in the approach to mental illness in the region. Where previously those with mental illnesses were held at Lyttelton Gaol, the hospital was founded on the principles of moral management, providing a more supportive environment for patients. Commitment to this approach varied throughout the hospital's existence, until it was closed in 1999 due to replacement by the neighbouring Hillmorton Hospital. The final buildings of the former Sunnyside Hospital were demolished in April 2007 to make way for additional housing, a move which was met with protest due to the architectural and cultural significance of the structures. Hillmorton Hospital continues to act as a dedicated mental health facility for the city from nearby to the original Sunnyside location.

In 1933, Hillmorton was also chosen as the site for a Carmelite monastery to be established as the order's first New Zealand presence. The monastery was originally founded in a pre-existing homestead in June 1933, with the first wing not being completed until four years later. This was followed by the addition of a subsequent wing in 1950, since which point the monastery has maintained their presence in the heart of Hillmorton.

Geography
The Heathcote River (Ōpāwaho) River flows along the northern boundary of Hillmorton which along with Curletts Road is the boundary with Wigram.  Hillmorton also borders several other suburbs:

Aidanfield West of Templetons Road. (properties on Templetons Road are part of Hillmorton)

Hoon Hay South of Halswell Road, except Coppell Place which is part of Hillmorton (properties on this section of Haslwell Road are part of Hillmorton)

Spreydon South of Lincoln Road (properties on this section of Lincoln Road are part of Hillmorton)

Addington West of Wrights Road (properties on Wrights Road are not part of Hillmorton)

Middleton to the North, separated by the Christchurch Southern Motorway

Demographics

Hillmorton had a population of 2,838 at the 2018 New Zealand census, an increase of 183 people (6.9%) since the 2013 census, and an increase of 678 people (31.4%) since the 2006 census. There were 1,089 households. There were 1,383 males and 1,455 females, giving a sex ratio of 0.95 males per female. The median age was 38.2 years (compared with 37.4 years nationally), with 483 people (17.0%) aged under 15 years, 570 (20.1%) aged 15 to 29, 1,323 (46.6%) aged 30 to 64, and 462 (16.3%) aged 65 or older.

Ethnicities were 77.1% European/Pākehā, 8.9% Māori, 3.8% Pacific peoples, 16.3% Asian, and 3.2% other ethnicities (totals add to more than 100% since people could identify with multiple ethnicities).

The proportion of people born overseas was 26.0%, compared with 27.1% nationally.

Although some people objected to giving their religion, 49.4% had no religion, 37.6% were Christian, 2.7% were Hindu, 0.5% were Muslim, 0.8% were Buddhist and 3.1% had other religions.

Of those at least 15 years old, 552 (23.4%) people had a bachelor or higher degree, and 420 (17.8%) people had no formal qualifications. The median income was $35,300, compared with $31,800 nationally. The employment status of those at least 15 was that 1,260 (53.5%) people were employed full-time, 342 (14.5%) were part-time, and 63 (2.7%) were unemployed.

Education
Hillmorton High School is a secondary school catering for years 7 to 13.

Southern Regional Health School is a special school.

References

Suburbs of Christchurch